The Khyber train safari is a defunct tourist train that was operated and maintained by Tourism Corporation of Khyber Pakhtunkhwa and Pakistan Railways between Peshawar and Attock Khurd. It was the only passenger line in Pakistan still operating steam engines.

History

Passenger service (1925–1982)

Regular passenger service along the Khyber Pass Railway began on 4 November 1925 between Peshawar City railway station and Landi Kotal railway station. The oil-fired steam engines, which pushed and pulled the carriages from the rear and front, were built by Vulcan Foundry and by Kitson & Co in the United Kingdom. One of the unusual features of this train journey was that its route passed across Peshawar Airport's main runway. On 3 April 1926, the railway was extended to Landi Khana, just 3 kilometers from the Torkham border crossing with Afghanistan. In 1932, the Landi Kotal to Landi Khana section of railway was closed down at the insistence of Afghan government. Regularly scheduled rail service continued between Peshawar and Landi Kotal until 1982, when it stopped due to lack of commercial value. The 2006 monsoon season rains in the Khyber Pass washed away significant sections of the railway. The track as of today is closed for all rail traffic.

Khyber steam safari (1996–2006)

In 1996, Sehrai Travels’ in collaboration with Sarhad Tourism Corporation launched the Khyber Steam Safari for foreign and local tourists and was described by Time Magazine as "a journey into time and history". The train consisted of a refurbished parlour car and two second class coaches pulled by two vintage steam locomotives, as those used originally on the Khyber Pass Railway. The train was run on the first Sunday of every month as a charter, however the local population around the Khyber Pass were allowed free access. Pakistan Tourism Development Corporation took over operations in 2006 and in the same year the service was suspended due to damage of the line caused by monsoon rain.

Khyber train safari (2015–present)
In 2015, the Tourism Corporation Khyber Pakhtunkhwa took control of the former Khyber Steam Safari and renamed it to Khyber Train Safari (also known as Abaseen Steam Safari). However, the route now takes the train between Peshawar and Attock Khurd.

In 2021, the Government of Khyber Pakhtunkhwa announced the relaunch of the project on its two routes: Peshawar to Attock, and Peshawar to Takht-i-Bahi. The Peshawar to Landi Kotal route was to remain defunct. An inspection of the damaged tracks in the Khyber District was carried out by officials and technical staff of Pakistan Railways in November 2021.

Route
 Peshawar Cantonment–Attock Khurd via Karachi–Peshawar Railway Line (presently operating Khyber Train Safari)
 Peshawar City–Landi Kotal via Khyber Pass Railway (now defunct Khyber Steam Safari)

Station stops
Khyber Train Safari
Peshawar Cantonment
Peshawar City
Nasarpur
Taru Jabba
Pabbi
Pir Piai
Khushhal
Nowshera Junction
Hayat Sher Pao Shahid
Akora Khattak
Jhangira Road
Khairabad Kund
Attock Khurd

Khyber Steam Safari
 Peshawar City
 Peshawar Cantonment
 Jamrud
 Bagiarari
 Medanak (1st Reversing Station)
 Chaghi (2nd Reversing Station)
 Shahgai
 Kata Kushta
 Zintara
 Sultan Khel
 Landi Kotal
 Torra Tigga (3rd Reversing Station)
 Landi Khana (4th Reversing Station)

Equipment
Peshawar locomotive shed continues to maintain 3 steam engines, which were used on the original passenger service on the Khyber Pass Railway, the Khyber steam safari and now on the Khyber train safari.
 2-8-0 HG/S #2216 built by Kitson and Company in 1916
 2-8-0 HG/S #2277 built by Vulcan Foundry in 1923
 2-8-0 HG/S #2306 built by Vulcan foundry in 1923

See also 
 Pakistan Railways
 Peshawar Circular Railway
 Karachi–Peshawar Railway Line

References

Passenger trains in Pakistan
Tourist attractions in Khyber Pakhtunkhwa
Railway stations on Khyber Pass line
Railway lines opened in 1894